Javier Gómez-Navarro Navarrete (born 13 September 1945) is a Spanish politician who served as Minister of Trade and Tourism from July 1993 to May 1996.

References

1945 births
Living people
Complutense University of Madrid alumni
Government ministers of Spain
20th-century Spanish politicians